Valerie Constance Yule   (2 January 1929 – 28 January 2021) was an Australian researcher in literacy and imagination, and a clinical child psychologist, academic, school psychologist and teacher, working in disadvantaged schools, Melbourne and Monash Universities in psychology and education; the Royal Children's Hospital, Melbourne and the Royal Aberdeen Children's Hospital; and hon. research fellow (Psychology) at Aberdeen University.

Yule died on 28 January 2021. She was posthumously awarded the Medal of the Order of Australia at the 2021 Queen's Birthday Honours.

Education
Methodist Ladies' College, Melbourne (East 1945), BA (Hons), History and English, MA Psychology, Dip Ed, and PhD Education - research thesis on Orthography and Reading, Spelling and Society.

Memberships
Fellow of the Galton Institute (UK); Member, British Psychological Society; Vice-President, Simplified Spelling Society (UK); Member, Independent Scholars Association of Australia, and of Australian educational and social reforming organizations. Founder, the non-profit Australian Centre for Social Innovations, 1991; member, the British Institute for Social Inventions, 1984.

Original work
 Research to make literacy easier by removing the barriers. This includes the concept of online access to understanding and self-help, and improving English spelling by maximising its advantages as well as reducing its disadvantages to meet needs and abilities of users and learners.  This cognitive psychological research approach goes beyond the conventional assumptions of a purely phonetic solution to spelling reform as defined in Wikipedia.
 Studies of children's imagination and applied imagination.
 Social innovations; alternatives for social problems; more natural childcare; preventing waste of intelligence; the cognitive effects of very loud music, now pervasive and global; non-destructive pleasures; economic and political alternatives for sustainability without requiring continual growth; humane solutions to population growth; cutting production of waste to reduce carbon emissions; the psychology of peace.

Published work
 What Happens to Children: The Origins of violence. A Collection of stories told by disadvantaged children who could not write them. Sydney: Angus & Robertson 1979 
 Psychology For Teenagers - Making the Most of Who You Are
 What's Primary School for, anyway? Melbourne: Primary Education, 1981
 The Encyclopaedia of Social Inventions. Ed. Valerie Yule & Nicholas Albery. Institute of Social Inventions. London. 1989.
 The Book of Spells & Misspells. Sussex, UK: The Book Guild. 2005
 L. Ivanov and V. Yule. Roman Phonetic Alphabet for English. Contrastive Linguistics. XXXII, 2007, 2. pp. 50–64

See also
 Interspel

Notes

External links
 Spelling Reform on valerieyule.com.au
 English Spelling Improvement on valerieyule.com.au
 Valerie Yule Spelling Video on Eidos Fresh Ideas, YouTube
 Valerie Yule Articles on Online Opinion
 Crisis of Human Energy on Ockham's Razor
 Valerie Yule on Employee Democracy on Access My Library

1929 births
2021 deaths
Child psychologists
Academic staff of Monash University
Australian non-fiction writers
Australian psychologists
Australian women psychologists
Peace psychologists
Recipients of the Medal of the Order of Australia
Academic staff of the University of Melbourne